Ronel De Jesus Blanco (born August 31, 1993) is a Dominican professional baseball pitcher for the Houston Astros of Major League Baseball (MLB). He made his MLB debut in 2022.

Career
Blanco signed with the Houston Astros as an international free agent on April 27, 2016. He split the 2016 season between the DSL Astros and the GCL Astros, going a combined 7–1 with a 2.13 ERA and 59 strikeouts over  innings. Blanco split the 2017 season between the Quad Cities River Bandits and the Buies Creek Astros, going a combined 6–5 with a 3.38 ERA and 79 strikeouts over 88 innings. He split the 2018 season between Buies Creek and the Corpus Christi Hooks, going a combined 7–1 with a 3.65 ERA and 71 strikeouts over  innings. Blanco split the 2019 season between the Tri-City ValleyCats, Corpus Christi, and the Round Rock Express, going a combined 5–2 with a 4.96 ERA and 57 strikeouts over 49 innings. Blanco did not play in 2020 due to the cancellation of the Minor League Baseball season because of the COVID-19 pandemic. Blanco spent the 2021 season with the Sugar Land Skeeters. 

On April 7, 2022, the Astros selected Blanco's contract and placed him on the major league roster.  On April 9, he made his major league debut in the eighth inning against the Los Angeles Angels.

See also

 List of Major League Baseball players from the Dominican Republic

References

External links

1993 births
Living people
People from Santiago de los Caballeros
Dominican Republic expatriate baseball players in the United States
Major League Baseball players from the Dominican Republic
Major League Baseball pitchers
Houston Astros players
Dominican Summer League Astros players
Gulf Coast Astros players
Tri-City ValleyCats players
Quad Cities River Bandits players
Buies Creek Astros players
Corpus Christi Hooks players
Round Rock Express players
Sugar Land Skeeters players
Sugar Land Space Cowboys players
Estrellas Orientales players